Akkad Bakkad Bambey Bo is a television series that originally aired on Star Plus channel, and later was syndicated on Disney Channel India. The story revolves around the life of a ghost of a road side vendor, who has to perform a certain number of good deeds to go on to heaven, and his upmarket friends who he refers to as babua log. The babua log encounter tough situations related to evil mythical creatures who want to take over the world while performing their day-to-day activities. They are then saved by the vendor who is a ghost himself. The program stars Devender Chaudhry as Natwarlal Prasad Yadav.

Cast
 Devender Chaudhary as Natwarlal Prasad Yadav  aka Nati
 Vivek V. Mashru as Arnav Kapoor
 Menaka Lalwani as Caddy
 Sheetal Maulik as Sheena
 Prateek Jain as Dhruv
 Ankit Shah as Vikram
 Vijay Ganju as Gappu
 KK Goswami as Gappu's Nephew
 Abhinav Jain as Boss

References

External links
 
Akkad Bakkad Bambey Bo Official Site

StarPlus original programming
Indian children's television series
2005 Indian television series debuts
2005 Indian television series endings
Indian fantasy television series
Ghosts in television